Dagana is one of the 45 departments of Senegal and one of the three departments of the north-western region of Saint-Louis. The capital is Dagana.

There are five communes; Dagana, Richard Toll, Rosso (Senegal), Gaé and Ross Béthio

Rural districts (Communautés rurales) comprise:
 Mbane Arrondissement:
Bokhol.
Mbane
Ndiaye Arrondissement:
Ngnith
Diama
Ronkh

Historic sites

 Fort of Dagana
 Water factory of Mbakhana
 The Residence at Richard Toll known as Baron Roger's Folly (or Chateau)

In popular culture
The Siren of Good Intentions a novel by J. E. Mooney, . Mooney was a Peace Corps volunteer in Bokhol in the mid-1970s.

References

Departments of Senegal
Saint-Louis Region